Eno is a Chinese clothing and accessories company based in Shanghai, founded in 2006.

References
<https://money.cnn.com/2009/10/29/smallbusiness/china_street_fashion.fsb/index.htm?cnn=yes]>
<http://www.cnngo.com/shanghai/none/shanghai-hot-list-20-people-watch-165740>
<https://web.archive.org/web/20101225032500/http://www.designcouncil.org.uk/publications/Design-Council-Magazine-issue-7/Shanghai-surprise/>
<http://www.smartshanghai.com/venue/2726/Eno_shanghai>
<https://web.archive.org/web/20090701074440/http://www.cityweekend.com.cn/shanghai/listings/shopping/clothing-accessories/has/eno/>
<https://web.archive.org/web/20091202224740/http://www.thisnext.com/item/243EF7C3/B8C02DD6/eno>
<http://www.chinatravel.net/feature/Greenovate-Green-China-Travel-Fashion-Fun/2223.html?
<http://show.thechinabusinessnetwork.com/index.php?option=com_content&view=article&catid=55:retail-and-consumer-goods&id=56:renee-hartmann-co-founder-of-eno-&Itemid=65>

External links
 www.eno.cn
 www.enovatechina.com

Clothing companies of China
Companies based in Shanghai
Clothing companies established in 2006
Chinese brands